Lutos may be,

Lutos language
Battle of Lutos